Inc. No World (stylized as inc. no world; formerly inc. and Teen Inc.) is an American music duo originally from Los Angeles formed by brothers Andrew and Daniel Aged. Their first full-length album, No World, was released on February 19, 2013.

Musical career
inc. no world was formed as Teen Inc. around 2010 by brothers Andrew and Daniel Aged after a series of tours and session work with various artists.
They produced, mixed, and self-released their first single, Fountains in 2010 along with the b-side "Friends of the Night".

They later released an EP titled 3 in 2011 under the name "Inc."

Their debut album, No World, was released under 4AD in February 2013. Two singles were released from the album: "The Place", which was featured in the Grand Theft Auto V soundtrack, and "5 Days".

In February 2014, they released a collaboration single with English singer-songwriter, FKA twigs, titled "FKA x inc.". They also produced the song "One Time" for her debut album, LP1, released in August 2014. On December 1, 2014 they posted an unreleased demo from 2011 titled "Our Time" to their official YouTube account, along with the announcement that they would be releasing new music in 2015.

On February 17, 2015, the single "A Teardrop from Below" was released. A year later, On May 6, 2016, they released a new song titled "The Wheel". On July 14, 2016 they announced that they were finished recording their second studio album which will be released shortly through their own label, No World Recordings. On July 25, 2016, they announced that their second studio album, As Light As Light,  will be released on September 9, 2016.

Members 
Andrew Aged – vocals, guitars, production
Daniel Aged – bass, production, keyboards, pedal steel guitar

Discography

Albums

Extended plays

Singles
"Fountains / Friend of the Night" (2010)
"Eiffel Tower" /  "The Things That I Would Do" (with Francis and the Lights) (2011)
"The Place" (2012)
"5 Days" (2012)
"FKA x inc." (2014)
"A Teardrop from Below" (2015)
"The Wheel" (2016)

Music videos

References

Sibling musical duos
Male musical duos
4AD artists
Musical groups established in 2010
Musical groups from Los Angeles
2010 establishments in California
Year of birth missing (living people)